Julia Kindt  (born 1975) is an academic and writer who specialises in ancient Greek history and religion. She is a professor at the Department of Classics and Ancient History at the University of Sydney, Australia.

Career
Kindt graduated from the University of Munich in 2000 with a Master of Arts in Ancient History. She then studied at the University of Cambridge, where she completed a PhD in 2003. In 2005, she was selected as one of the inaugural Katharine Graham fellows at the University of Chicago; the fellowship was created by an endowment from the estate of the publisher of The Washington Post.

In 2012, Kindt wrote her first book, Rethinking Greek Religion, in which she suggests that the scholarly consensus that the polis is the central focus of ancient Greek religion needs to be re-examined. She argues that other aspects of ancient Greek religion deserve more scholarly attention than they have previously received.

Kindt's second book, Revisiting Delphi, was published in 2016. At the time of its publication she was an assistant professor at the University of Sydney  She was also a senior editor of the Oxford Research Encyclopedia of Religion.

In 2018, she was selected as a Future Fellow with the Australian Research Council, under their ARC Future Fellowships program. The fellowship runs until 2022. She was also elected into the Australian Academy of the Humanities in 2018.

In 2019, she became a full professor in the Department of Classics and Ancient History at the University of Sydney. As of October 2021, she teaches courses in ancient Greek history and religion.

She is a member of the Editorial Board for Journal of Ancient History.

Works

Authored
 Kindt, J. 2012. Rethinking Greek Religion. Cambridge University Press. 
 Kindt, J. 2016. Revisiting Delphi: Religion and Storytelling in Ancient Greece. Cambridge University Press.

Edited
 Eidinow, E. and J. Kindt, eds. 2015. The Oxford Handbook of Ancient Greek Religion. Oxford University Press. 
 E. Eidinow, J. Kindt and R. Osborne, eds. 2016. Theologies of Ancient Greek Religion. Cambridge University Press. 
 Kindt, J. (ed.) 2021. Animals in Ancient Greek Religion. Routledge.

References

Living people
1975 births
Women historians
Women academics
Writers from Sydney
Academic staff of the University of Sydney
Fellows of the Australian Academy of the Humanities
Place of birth missing (living people)